Donald Brown Anderson (October 28, 1904 – December 16, 1956) was a justice of the Idaho Supreme Court from 1955 to 1956. He received his LL.B. from the University of Idaho College of Law in 1927.

Early life
Born in Canada at Cardston, Alberta, Anderson's family moved to the United States in his childhood and farmed near Weiser, Idaho. He graduated from Weiser High School, received his LL.B. degree from the University of Idaho College of Law in 1927, and entered the practice of law in Canyon County at Caldwell.

Public service
Anderson served as the prosecuting attorney of Canyon County for six years in the 1930s, and was a probate judge for four years, from 1937 to 1941. In April 1941, he joined the Federal Bureau of Investigation (FBI), working in Chicago and Washington, D.C., ultimately becoming a special assistant to the Attorney General J. Howard McGrath. Anderson returned to Idaho in 1948 to resume the practice of law, and served as a judge of the Idaho Seventh Judicial District from 1950 to 1954, when he was elected to the state supreme court, where he remained until his death.

Personal life and death
On September 2, 1955, Anderson married Lois Nichols of Boise, with whom he had a son, Ross Nichols Anderson.

On December 16, 1956, Anderson was reported missing from his home, and a search ensued. It was determined that the first shot had failed to penetrate the skull, and the death was ruled a suicide. Anderson was buried at Canyon Hill Cemetery in Caldwell.

See also
List of solved missing person cases

References

1904 births
1950s missing person cases
1956 deaths
1956 suicides
Canadian emigrants to the United States
Federal Bureau of Investigation agents
Formerly missing people
Justices of the Idaho Supreme Court
Multiple gunshot suicides
Missing person cases in Idaho
Suicides by firearm in Idaho
University of Idaho College of Law alumni